Fragaria iturupensis, the Iturup strawberry, is a species of wild strawberry, endemic to Iturup in the Kuril Islands.  It is noted to have relatively large berries for a wild species, similar in appearance to those of Fragaria virginiana.

Polyploidy
All strawberries have a base haploid count of 7 chromosomes. Fragaria iturupensis was initially reported as octoploid (with 8 sets of chromosomes, 56 in total), but subsequent testing found decaploids (with ten sets of chromosomes, a total of 70). It is unclear whether the earlier report was an error, or whether two forms exist.

References

External links
Hummer, K.E., Sabitov, A., & Davis, T. 2005. Iturup And Sakhalin Island Strawberries. HortScience 40(4): 1127. Abstract.

iturupensis
Kuril Islands